= Deafness in Colombia =

This article brings attention to the Deaf and Hard of Hearing population of Colombia. Colombia is part a party to the Convention on the Rights of Persons with Disabilities, which it ratified in 2011. Nonetheless, disparities between Deaf and Hard of Hearing Colombian individuals still exist. The sign language in Colombia is referred to as Colombian Sign Language, which is stable. Additionally, newborn screening exists in Colombia and is facilitated utilizing transient otoacoustic omissions. Early intervention includes cochlear implants and deaf education. Lastly, deaf or hard of hearing individuals in Colombia often experience difficulties with communication, which can lead to a plethora of following issues. There is a call for more research and data on healthcare experiences for the Deaf and Hard of Hearing population in Colombia.

== Human and civil rights in Colombia ==
Colombia recognizes the rights to life, liberty, and security of the person, principles established in Article 3 of the Universal Declaration of Human Rights and reflected in Colombia's constitutional human-rights protections. Additionally, Colombia is a party to the Convention on the Rights of Persons with Disabilities, which it ratified in 2011. Colombian law requires the government to support minors with disabilities in achieving independence, participating in their communities, and maintaining a good standard of living. These protections, established under Article 36 of the Children and Adolescents Code (Act No. 1098 of 2006), supplement the protections already provided through Colombia’s Constitution and international agreements. Furthermore, Colombia has implemented several programs to improve accessibility and inclusion for deaf people. These efforts include partnerships with deaf advocacy organizations, Colombian Sign Language interpretation and captioning, accessible online content, and accommodations at cultural events such as plays, concerts, and guided tours. These efforts align with priorities identified by the World Federation of the Deaf, which emphasizes the recognition and use of national sign languages as essential to ensuring that deaf people have equal access to information, education, public services, and other areas of society, including private life.

Deaf and Hard of Hearing individuals in Colombia have experienced inequalities in employment despite existing legal protections. Research on DHH employment in Colombia has identified significant disparities between DHH and hearing workers, particularly in wages, education, gender, and working hours.

== Sign language in Colombia ==
Colombian Sign Language is an indigenous sign language used by Deaf community in Colombia. It is estimated to have approximately between 10,000 and 1,000,000 users. In total, there are approximately 472,000 deaf individuals residing in Colombia as of 2026. Additionally, the prevalence of deafness in Colombia 0.16, which is lower than the global prevalence. Colombian Sign Language is currently considered stable, with an EGIDS (expanded graded intergenerational disruption scale) score of 5, meaning that it is neither endangered nor fully established at an institutional level.

== Newborn screening in Colombia ==
Newborn hearing screening is used in Colombia to identify hearing problems early in infancy. A study conducted at Hospital Universitario San Ignacio in Bogotá screened newborns using transient otoacoustic emissions, a test that evaluates hearing function. Because newborns in Colombia are often discharged from the hospital early, the researchers found that performing hearing screening during outpatient infant checkups after the first 48 hours of life may be a practical approach. Of the 1,523 newborns whose parents consented to screening, 24 (1.6%) did not pass the initial screening and were referred for additional testing. These findings demonstrate how newborn screening programs can be adapted to Colombia's healthcare resources and early-discharge practices while still supporting early detection of hearing impairment. Furthermore, based on data collected from 103,244 newborns from Fundacion Santa Fe de Bogotá, 15.9% newborns fail their hearing screening. Out of those who fail, 40.0% did not follow-up with a provider. Out of those screened at birth, the mean age, in months, for diagnosis was 2 months, whereas those who were not screened, was 48 months. Additionally, Transient otoacoustic emissions are used to examine newborns.

== Early intervention ==
Cochlear implantation is an intervention available for children with profound hearing loss in Colombia. A 2016 study examining the cost-effectiveness of cochlear implantation and deaf education across seven Latin American countries found that Colombia performed approximately 500 cochlear implant procedures annually, representing the highest estimated accessibility among the countries studied. This figure was equivalent to approximately 43% of the estimated annual number of infants with profound hearing loss. The study also found that Colombia reached its target capacity for cochlear implant services, defined as having trained otolaryngologists, audiologists, and speech therapists to provide these services for 30% of children born with profound hearing loss.

== Healthcare ==
Research comparing Deaf and hearing populations in Colombia has identified disparities in health outcomes. Communication access remains an important healthcare concern, particularly because Deaf Colombians vary in their use of Spanish and Colombian Sign Language (LSC). Researchers have called for more accessible health surveys and stronger data collection to better understand the healthcare needs of this population. A 2025 study found that 67% of surveyed participants used written notes to communicate with healthcare personnel, while 35% used professional in-person interpreters. The study also found that mobile phone ownership was associated with better-self perceived health, although findings regarding functional difficulties varied between surveys. Furthermore, as of 2020 it has been stated that it is recommended that a deaf individual access an interpreter while in a healthcare facility to assist with communication. Deaf individuals of Colombia occasionally attend consultations with a communication mediator, writing to communicate their reason for visiting, lip-reading, gesturing, or other technological tools to communicate. These methods of interaction become less focused on the patient with more indirect communication, with a lack of understanding on both parties' sides. A patient in a 2020 study directly stated: "the doctor knows that the consultation is going to take longer, writing, writing. He is worried because his next appointment has already arrived, other patients that are already there [...]." Furthermore, it was found that the healthcare provider's attitude felt negative, and was specifically aimed towards many deaf individuals, including feels of annoyance, impatience, and franticness from providers. It was also noted that there are instances where interpreters are not allowed into the consultation. Interpreters also claimed that there was a poor healthcare provider attitude towards the deaf patient. Interpreters observed both a major lack of kindness and empathy during the consultation. Feelings of sadness, helplessness from the interpreter can be common during unfair interactions and attitudes towards deaf patients. Moreover, it was noted that healthcare administration had particularly been substantially poor towards deaf individuals, often focusing on the interpreter if there is one present. Healthcare providers have claimed to make communication possible, but there is a call for improving methods, and potentially training healthcare providers in Colombian sign language more often.
